Vanya Mirzoyan (born 5 July 1948) Armenian scientist-mathematician.

Biography 
V.A. Mirzoyan was born in Mountainous Jagir, an Armenian Village located in Shamkhor District of Artsakh. His father, Aleksandr Ghazar Mirzoyan, was a teacher of Geography and Astronomy at the Secondary School of Mountainous Jagir, mother - Arshaluys Sergey Harutyunyan was an employee. From 1964 to 1968 he studied at Yerevan Technical College of Electronic Computers. In 1967 graduated from Yerevan Secondary Correspondence School 3 and was admitted to Yerevan State University, Department of Mechanics and Mathematics, which he graduated in 1972. From 1972 to 1974 he served in the Soviet Army as an officer. From October 1975 to October 1978 he pursued his targeted postgraduate studies at the University of Tartu, Estonia, with a degree in “Geometry and Topology” under scientific supervision of Doctor of Physical and Mathematical sciences, member of the Estonian Academy of Sciences, professor Ülo G. Lumiste. From 1979 to 1981 he worked as a professor of the Algebra and Geometry Department at Armenian State Pedagogical University named after Khachatur Abovian. Since 1981, he has been a staff member of National Polytechnic University of Armenia (Yerevan), held the positions of Assistant, Associate Professor, Professor, Head of Department.

Scientific interests 
Scientific interests include Riemannian geometry, which studies Riemannian manifolds and submanifolds with natural parallel and semi-parallel tensor fields. These are Riemannian symmetric, semi-symmetric, Einstein, semi-Einstein, Ricci-semisymmetric manifolds and their isometric realizations in spaces of constant curvature.

Scientific results 

 Has given general local classification of Riemannian Ricci-semisymmetric manifolds,
 Has opened semi-Einstein manifolds and singled out the class of such manifolds in the form of cones over Einstein manifolds,
 Has given the local classification and geometric description of Ricci-semisymmetric hypersurfaces in Euclidean spaces,
 Has studied and geometrically described various classes of Semi-Einstein submanifolds of arbitrary codimension in Euclidean spaces,
 Has established fundamental interrelation between submanifolds with parallel tensor fields and submanifolds with corresponding semi-parallel tensor fields in spaces of constant curvature,
 Has given general local classification of normally flat Ricci-semisymmetric submanifolds in Euclidean spaces.

Awards 
 Candidate of Physical and Mathematical Sciences (21.01.1980, Moscow, Moscow State Pedagogical University named after V.I.Lenin)
 Doctor of Physical and Mathematical Sciences (21.01.1999, Kazan, KSU)

References

External links
 Profile at Marquis Who's Who
 Profile at Russian Mathematical Portal 
 Profile at Hayazg.info
  Main Scientific Works

1948 births
Living people
20th-century Armenian mathematicians
Yerevan State University alumni
University of Tartu alumni
21st-century Armenian mathematicians
Academic staff of the National Polytechnic University of Armenia